Uyo High School is a government secondary school in the city of Uyo, Akwa Ibom State. It is one of the notable oldest secondary schools in Akwa Ibom state. In 2018, the school had more than 5000 students.

References 

Schools in Akwa Ibom State
Uyo